The Echills Wood Railway is a  miniature hobbyist railway in Kingsbury Water Park, Warwickshire, England.

A feature of the railway is its gnome village, a collection of garden gnomes donated by the public. The gnome village was vandalised in September 2016, when several of the ornaments were damaged. The incident prompted members of the public to donate replacements following an appeal by railway members. Local newspaper, the Tamworth Herald also backed the appeal. The attraction was destroyed for a second time by vandals in April 2017.

References

External links
Echills Wood Railway site
Echills Wood Railway Observer Pages for regular updates on the railways activities. [This site is no longer active].

7¼ in gauge railways in England
Miniature railways in the United Kingdom
Kingsbury, Warwickshire